WASP-96b is a gas giant exoplanet. Its mass is 0.48 Jupiters. It is 0.0453 AU from the class G star WASP-96, which it orbits every 3.4 days. It is about 1,120 light-years away from Earth, in the constellation Phoenix. It was discovered in 2013 by the Wide Angle Search for Planets (WASP).

WASP-96b's spectrum is one of the items featured in the initial science release from the James Webb Space Telescope. The spectrum confirmed the presence of water, as well as providing evidence for "clouds and hazes" within the planet's atmosphere. Prior to this discovery, WASP-96b was thought to be free of clouds.

WASP-96b orbits its Sun-like star WASP-96 every 3.5 Earth days at a distance just one-ninth of the distance between Mercury and the Sun.

In July 2022, the atmospheric spectrum from James Webb was released as one of the first scientific images.

While the light curve released confirms properties of the planet that had already been determined from other observations – the existence, size, and orbit of the planet – the transmission spectrum revealed previously hidden details of the atmosphere: the unambiguous signature of water, indications of haze, and evidence of clouds that were suspected based on prior observations.

See also 
 Wide Angle Search for Planets

References

External links 

Exoplanets discovered by WASP
Giant planets
Hot Jupiters
Transiting exoplanets
Phoenix (constellation)
Exoplanets discovered in 2013